Zukerman is a surname. Notable people with the surname include:

 Arianna Zukerman (b. 1972). American singer, daughter of Eugenia and Pinchas
 Ashley Zukerman (b. 1983), Australian actor
 Eugenia Rich Zukerman (b. 1944), American flutist, writer, and journalist
 George Zukerman (b. 1927), Canadian bassoonist and impresario
 Natalia Zukerman (b. 1975), American artist and musician, daughter of Eugenia and Pinchas
 Pinchas Zukerman (b. 1948), Israeli-American violinist and conductor

See also
 Zukerman Chamber Players, classical music ensemble
 Zuckermann
 Cukierman

Jewish surnames
Yiddish-language surnames